The diocese of Rhandus is a titular see of the Roman Catholic Church in the Roman province of Mesopotamia.  The bishopric was centered on the town of Tur Abdin (in southeast Turkey) and was subordinate to Dara. 

The history of the Bishopric goes back to earliest episcopal activity in Roman Mesopotamia. Although Catholic interests are no longer active in the area, the Syriac Orthodox Church maintains churches and a number of Monasteries there.

List of Bishops
 Juan Niccolai OFM   Coadjutor Bishop of Tarija ( Bolivia )   February 20, 1944   August 16, 1947  
 António Ferreira Gomes   Coadjutor Bishop of Portalegre ( Portugal )   January 15, 1948   July 6, 1949
 Wilhelm Weskamm   Auxiliary Bishop in Paderborn ( Germany )   October 12, 1949   June 4, 1951  
 Paul-Léon-Jean Chevalier   Auxiliary Bishop of Le Mans ( France )   August 21, 1951   May 4, 1959  
 January Wawrzyniec Kulik   Auxiliary Bishop of Łódź ( Poland )   July 15, 1959   October 27, 1995

References

Catholic Church in Turkey
Catholic titular sees in Asia